Ikot Akpan Essien is a town located in the Oruk Anam Local Government Area, Akwa Ibom State, Nigeria. 
It is as well one among the major towns of the Abak/Midim Clan both in the southern region of Nigeria.

History 

Ikot Akpan Essien  town was formally the headquarters during the then Anam local government or Anam Council after it formal locations which was shifted from Ikot Okoro and latter to Urua anwa both today in Oruk Anam LGA.

References 

Towns in Oruk Anam